Huddersfield Town's 1936–37 campaign was a season that saw Town fight for their league status in Division 1. They finished 15th, a far cry from their third place finish the previous season.

Squad at the start of the season

Review
Town's 8th season under Clem Stephenson was another season of mediocrity, which had been continued for most of the previous few seasons with the exception of the previous season's 3rd-place finish. With no FA Cup run to fall back on either, Town were down in a relegation dogfight with nearly half the teams in the division, but luckily the records of Manchester United and Sheffield Wednesday were worse enough to see them drop down to Division 2.

Squad at the end of the season

Results

Division One

FA Cup

Appearances and goals

1936–37
English football clubs 1936–37 season